Frederick Nnaemeka Leonard, (born May 1, 1980) is a Nigerian actor who won the award for Best Supporting Actor in a movie at the Golden Icons Academy Movie Awards in 2014 and in 2016 won the City People Movie Award For Best Supporting Actor of the Year (English) at the City People Entertainment Awards.

Early life and education
Leonard was born in Anambra state in Nigeria which is a south-eastern geographical area of Nigeria predominantly occupied by the Igbo people of Nigeria. He is the firstborn child of his parents in a family of four consisting of two children, a mother and a father. He received primary education in St Peter's Anglican Primary School, Alausa, Ikeja In Lagos State and attended Oregun High School in Oregun, Ikeja In Lagos State also for secondary education. In bid to obtain a degree he relocated to Kaduna State In Northern Nigeria and applied to Kaduna Polytechnic where he was accepted and eventually graduated with a degree in biochemistry.

Career
Leonard debuted his career into the Nigerian movie industry in 2001 where he played brief one scene roles and took a break from acting almost immediately as he debuted in order to complete his university education and obtain a degree. Upon completion of his university education, Leonard returned to the Nigerian movie industry referred to commonly as Nollywood in 2008 and obtained his first ever lead role character in a movie titled Indian Doctor. In 2009, he ventured into the Nigerian TV soap opera series and featured in a TV series titled Disclosure which aired predominantly on Africa Magic on DSTV. Leonard debuted his career with a movie titled Grey and subsequently in 2019 produced a movie titled Void.

Influence
Leonard credited Bimbo Akintola, a Nigerian female actress as one of the people who have influenced his acting style.

Awards and nominations

Personal life
Leonard is an orphan and has spoken publicly about the devastating impact of losing both parents especially the death of his mother which he described as an unfortunate incident that has created a void in his life. Leonard in an interview with a Nigerian print media This Day, described himself as introvert and not the party type and also revealed that he doesn't drink nor smoke and maintains a very small circle of few friends and family.

Selected filmography

Films (partial)
Our Jesus Story (2020)
Void (2019)
The Reunion (2019)
A Better Family (2018) as Nick
In Every Way (2018) as Dominic
Discontent (2017) as Damian
Discontent II (2017) as Damian
Monster Under Skin (2015)
Monster Under Skin II (2015) 
Indian Doctor (2008)
40 Looks Good on You
Desperate son (2021)
The Royal dignity (2021)

See also
 List of Nigerian actors

References

External links
IMDb Page Of Frederick Leonard

Living people
21st-century Nigerian male actors
1976 births
Igbo male actors
Nigerian male film actors
Nigerian male television actors
Male actors from Anambra State
Kaduna Polytechnic alumni